Sergei Valerianovich Diyev (born 21 April 1958) is a Russian football manager and a former player who currently manages FC SKChF Sevastopol. He previously held Ukrainian citizenship.

External links
 

1958 births
Living people
Sportspeople from Poltava
Soviet footballers
Ukrainian footballers
FC Vorskla Poltava players
SKA Kiev players
FC Dnipro Cherkasy players
FC Dnipro players
FC Kryvbas Kryvyi Rih players
FC Spartak Sumy players
Ukrainian football managers
Russian football managers
FC Sevastopol managers
Association football midfielders
FC Sevastopol (Russia) managers